The 2015 Mid-America Intercollegiate Athletics Association football season was contested by twelve United States collegiate athletic programs that compete in the Mid-America Intercollegiate Athletics Association (MIAA) under the National Collegiate Athletic Association (NCAA) for the 2015 college football season. The season began on Thursday, September 3, 2015.

Conference teams

Coaches
The only head coach change in the conference is Missouri Southern's Denver Johnson who replaced Daryl Daye.

Please note that the information listed is the information before the season started.

Preseason outlook
Sporting News released their Top-25 on June 8, 2015. Two teams from the conference were ranked in the top 25: #7 Northwest Missouri and #14 Pittsburg State. That same day the Lindy's NCAA Division II Preseason Top 25 was released, where two teams placed in the top 25 from the conference: #6 Pittsburg State and #13 Northwest Missouri.

On August 4, MIAA Media Days was held at Sporting Park in Kansas City. Northwest Missouri was chosen as #1 and Pittsburg State was chosen as #2 for both Coaches and Media polls. The schools were ranked as follows:

On August 17, the American Football Coaches Association released the Preseason Division II Poll. Northwest Missouri State was selected to finish fifth, and Pittsburg State was chosen seventh.

On August 25, D2football.com released its Top 25 poll, which includes three MIAA schools. Pittsburg State ranked 6th, NW Missouri State 8th, and Central Missouri 20th.

( ) first place votes

( ) first place votes

Schedule
The first week of conference play began on Thursday, September 3, 2015. The schedule was subject to change.

Week 1

Week 2

Week 3

Week 4

Week 5

Week 6

Week 7

Week 8

Week 9

Week 10

Week 11

Postseason

NCAA Division II Playoffs

{{CFB Conference Schedule Entry|w/l=w|date=November 28|time=1:00 p.m.|homecoming=n|visiting_rank=11|visiting_team=Humboldt State|home_rank=1|home_team=NW Missouri St.|site_stadium=Bearcat Stadium|site_cityst=Maryville, MO|tv=|score=54–7 |overtime= |attend=4,160}}

BowlsSources:'''

Home game attendance

References